The Pamunkey River is a tributary of the York River, about  long, in eastern Virginia in the United States.  Via the York River it is part of the watershed of Chesapeake Bay.

Course
It flows generally southeastwardly past the Pamunkey Indian Reservation to the town of West Point, where it meets the Mattaponi River to form the York River. The river's course is used to define all or portions of the southern boundaries of Caroline and King William counties and the northern boundaries of Hanover and New Kent counties.

Variant names
The U.S. Board on Geographic Names settled on "Pamunkey River" as the river's official name in 1892.  According to the Geographic Names Information System, it has also been known as:
Pamauncke River
Pamoeoncock River
Pamunky River
Pemaeoncock
Yough-ta-mund
Youghtanund

See also
List of Virginia rivers

References

Columbia Gazetteer of North America entry
DeLorme (2005).  Virginia Atlas & Gazetteer.  Yarmouth, Maine: DeLorme.  .

Rivers of Virginia
Tributaries of the York River (Virginia)
Rivers of Caroline County, Virginia
Rivers of Hanover County, Virginia
Rivers of King William County, Virginia
Rivers of New Kent County, Virginia
Greater Richmond Region